Language is a single by New Zealand singer/songwriter Dave Dobbyn, released in 1994 as the first single from the Twist album. The song reached number 4 on the New Zealand charts.

Background
Dobbyn began writing the song while in Sydney. He had originally played 'Language' as an acoustic song, however, Twist producer Neil Finn suggested speeding it up and giving it more of a rock sound.

Legacy
Language was voted the 35th best New Zealand song of the 20th century by APRA, and featured on the related Nature's Best 2 CD.
It was also included on the live album Together in Concert: Live, which was performed with Bic Runga and Tim Finn.

External links
 Language Music Video (NZ On Screen)

References

1994 singles
APRA Award winners
Dave Dobbyn songs
Songs written by Dave Dobbyn
1994 songs